The Sierra de Luquillo is a mountain range located in the northeastern part of Puerto Rico.

Geography 
The mountains of the Sierra de Luquillo were formed by tectonic activity some 37 to 28 million years ago, the island being on the junction between the North American Plate and the Caribbean Plate. The main rock types are pyroclastic rocks, quartzdiorite and contact metamorphic hornfels, with some outcrops of alluvium, basalt and mafic rocks. Nine rivers have their sources in the mountains, flowing downward through steep, rocky and boulder-strewed channels before reach the coastal plains. The lower slopes are less wet, but the summits are immersed in clouds most of the year.

The Sierra de Luquillo consists of a series of summits linked by a horseshoe-shaped ridge. Running from west to east, some of the peaks include El Toro, El Cacique and El Yunque, joined by a ridge known as Cuchilla el Duque to Pico del Oeste and Pico del Este.

Mountains 
The highest summits of the Sierra de Luquillo are the following:

 El Toro - 3,526 ft. (1,075 m)
 El Yunque - 3,461 ft. (1,054 m)
 Pico del Este - 3,408 ft. (1,038 m)
 Pico del Oeste - 3,339 ft. (1,017 m)
 El Cacique - 3,326 ft. (1,013 m)
 Roca El Yunque - 3,270 ft. (996 m)
 Los Picachos - 3,041 ft. (926 m)
 Mount Britton - 3,011 ft. (917 m)
 Cerro La Mina - 2,919 ft. (889 m)

Flora and fauna 

The mountains are covered with rainforest, much of it in the El Yunque National Forest. About 240 species of native tree have been recorded in the forest, 88 species being considered rare and about 25 species being found nowhere else in the world. There are about 150 species of fern, and on the trees grow many epiphytes, including about 50 species of orchid. Common trees of the Sierra de Luquillo include Cyathea arborea, Prestoea montana, Cecropia peltata, and Ocotea species while Weinmannia pinnata, Brunellia comocladifolia, and Podocarpus coriaceus are found in the cloud forests of the highest peaks. These dwarf forests occur above the cumulus cloud bases and contain low, dense, species-poor vegetation cover known as elfin or pigmy forest. A research study found that between 1936 and 1988, there were 46 landslides associated with heavy rain in the upper regions of the mountains, and these created gaps that allowed the seeds of pioneering tree species to germinate and ferns such as Dicranopteris pectitnata to proliferate. The forest recovers more quickly after a natural disaster, such as a tropical cyclone, than it does after human activities such as logging, charcoal burning, coffee production or agriculture.

Some 127 species of terrestrial vertebrate have been recorded in the forest, including some rarities and some species endemic to Puerto Rico. The Puerto Rican amazon is critically endangered with fewer than 100 left in the wild. The Puerto Rican broad-winged hawk and Puerto Rican sharp-shinned hawk are both very rare. Many birds visit the island during their annual migrations. The Puerto Rican boa inhabits the lower slopes of the mountains, about 14 species of lizard are found in the forest and 13 species of small tree frogs known as coquí live in the canopy and are endemic to the island.

References

Further reading

External links 
 

Mountain ranges of Puerto Rico
Geography of Puerto Rico
Canóvanas, Puerto Rico
Carolina, Puerto Rico
Ceiba, Puerto Rico
Fajardo, Puerto Rico
Fajardo metropolitan area
Gurabo, Puerto Rico
Juncos, Puerto Rico
Las Piedras, Puerto Rico
Luquillo, Puerto Rico
Naguabo, Puerto Rico
Río Grande, Puerto Rico
Mountain ranges of the Caribbean